Sadd colors or sad colors were the colors of choice for the clothing of the members of the Massachusetts Bay Colony in seventeenth century America ("sadd"/ "sad" carried the meaning of "seriousness" rather than "sadness"). The Puritans have often been depicted wearing simple black and white, but for them, the color "black" was itself considered too bold for regular use and was reserved for community elders and for highly formal occasions such as when having one's portrait painted.  Black was considered so formal in part because black dye was difficult to obtain and black clothing had a tendency to fade to other colors rather quickly.  The Puritans, then, designated a set of colors which they called "sadd" colors for their everyday use.  These colors were deliberately subdued, and included such named colors as liver color, de Boys (the color of "the wood", from du bois in French), tawney, russet, rust, purple, French green (a very pale shade of gray-green), ginger lyne, deer color, orange, gridolin (from the French gris de lin, "flax blossom", a color resembling periwinkle), puce, folding color, Kendall green (a dark variety of French green), Lincoln green (a more vivid shade of green akin to forest green), barry, milly, tuly, and philly mort (from the French words feuille morte, "dead leaf", a dark gray-brown).

References

Color in culture
Colonial Massachusetts